Midnight Diner (Chinese: 深夜食堂) is a 2017 Chinese television series adapted from the Japanese manga series Shinya Shokudō. A co-production between mainland China and Taiwan, the series is directed by Taiwan's Tsai Yueh-Hsun and stars Huang Lei as the Master, and features numerous celebrities in cameo roles as guests. The series aired on 12 June to 30 June 2017 via Beijing TV and Zhejiang TV.

Unlike its predecessors, the series was widely panned by the audience and received the a rating of 2.3, the lowest-ever rating for a television show on Douban. It was criticized for its rigid adaptation, failure to include Chinese elements, excessive product placement, and unrealistic characters and stories.

Synopsis
The story follows a mysterious chef and his late night restaurant which open from midnight to dawn. There are no fixed items on his menu, but the Master will take orders from any customer and cook up whatever they ask for. As the Master cooks, his patrons tell him their life stories.

Cast
 Huang Lei as Master

Patrons

 Mark Chao as Mark
 Janine Chang as Sun Kewei
 He Jiong
 Hai Qing
 Ivy Chen
 Ma Su
 Liu Haoran
 Jam Hsiao as Li Ang
 Richie Ren
 Qi Wei
 Liang Jing
 Cherrie Ying
 Xu Jiao
 Hu Bingqing as Xi Xi
 Wu Xin
 Wang Xun
 Chin Shih-chieh
 Kelly Niu Tien
 Yu Hsiao-hui
 Shawn Wei
 Ye Qing
 Xiu Jiekai
 Yedda Chen
 Song Yang
 Kan Qingzi
 Jason Tsou
 Zhang Wen
 Qian Yongchen
 Kirsten Ren
 Jiang Qilin
 Lu Qian
 Sui Yongliang
 Hong Chenying
 Yang Yitong
 Jia Jinghui
 Gao Feng
 Li Mingzhong
 Shi Shi
 Guo Lin
 Zhu Yan Man Zi
 Zhang Ruihan
 Chi Jia
 Cai Lu
 Fang Jiayi
 Xu Wei
 Huang Haoyong
 Sun Yang
 Zhang Han
 Li Jiacheng
 Li Jiatong
 Xie Chengying
 Zhou Shuai
 Jiang Xueming
 Zhai Aohui
 Zhou Houan
 Guo Xin
 Xie Donghai
 Feng Ruoqi
 Xu Kaicheng
 Jian Zezheng
 Cai Fengze
 Heaven Hai

Ratings 

 Highest ratings are marked in red, lowest ratings are marked in blue

See also
 Late Night Restaurant

References

External links

Zhejiang Television original programming
Beijing Television original programming
2017 Chinese television series debuts
2017 Chinese television series endings
Chinese comedy-drama television series
Television shows based on manga
Television series by Hualu Baina Film & TV